The Small Jazhincë Lake is a small lake on the Šar Mountains in Kosovo. The lake is surrounded by large rocks.

See also 
 Big Jažinačko Lake
 Donji Vir Lake

References 

Šar Mountains
Lakes of Kosovo